The More We Are Together is a British television comedy which aired in 1971 and was produced by Yorkshire Television. Cast included Betty Marsden, Victor Brooks, Avril Angers and Roy Barraclough. The series exists in the archives, despite the wiping of the era.

References

External links

1971 British television series debuts
1971 British television series endings
English-language television shows
ITV sitcoms
1970s British comedy television series
Television series by Yorkshire Television